The Clans Are Still Marching is a live DVD released by German heavy metal band Grave Digger on 7 March 2011 via Napalm Records. It was filmed live at the world-famous Wacken Open Air festival on 6 August 2010, where they performed their Tunes of War album in its entirety.

Track listing
"The Brave" – 3:33
"Scotland United" – 4:58
"The Dark of the Sun" – 4:57
"William Wallace (Braveheart)" – 5:40
"The Bruce (The Lion King)" – 6:49
"The Battle of Flodden" – 5:19
"The Ballad of Mary (Queen of Scots)" – 5:21
"The Truth" – 4:05
"Cry for Freedom (James the VI)" – 3:34
"Killing Time" – 3:45
"Rebellion (The Clans Are Marching)" – 5:25
"Culloden Muir" – 5:14
"Ballad of a Hangman" – 4:42
"Excalibur" – 5:06
"Heavy Metal Breakdown" – 7:21

Bonus Material
The DVD was released as digibook CD + DVD and digibook DVD + CD – both with bonus audio CD with the same track list (excluding DVD extras). Audio CD was not released separately. The DVD features bonus material which contains the following:

"Highland Farewell" video clip"
"Behind the scenes ("Highland Farewell")"
"History interview with Chris Boltendahl (in English)"
"History interview with Chris Boltendahl (in German)"
"Axel Ritt's iPhone clips"
"Photo galleries (Wacken 2010 slide show)"

Personnel
 Chris Boltendahl – vocals
 Axel Ritt – guitars
 Jens Becker – bass
 Stefan Arnold – drums
 H.P. Katzenburg – keyboards

Additional Musicians
 Van Canto – choir & backup vocals
 Hansi Kürsch – additional vocals on "Rebellion (The Clans Are Marching)"
 Doro Pesch – additional vocals on "The Ballad of Mary (Queen of Scots)"
 Baul Muluy Pipes & Drums – choir on "The Brave"

Production
 Gyula Havancsák – cover art
 Andreas Schöwe – photography
 Chris Boltendahl – producer
 Jörg Umbreit – mixing, mastering
 Andreas Marschall – producer, director
 Heiner Thimm – producer, director
 Jacky Lehmann – engineering (audio)

References

Grave Digger (band) albums
2011 video albums
Napalm Records video albums
Live video albums